Roe Beck also known as the River Roe in its lower reaches, is a beck that flows through Cumbria, England. It is a lower tributary of the River Caldew which it joins near Gaitsgill south of Dalston.

Course
Its headwaters rise on high ground near Hardrigg Hall between Lamonby and Skelton, it then flows north-west where it is joined by Peel Gill near Skelton Wood End. Other tributaries such as Whale Gill and Cockley Beck merge as it flows past Sowerby Row and Middlesceugh, where it turns northwards to meet its tributary, the River Ive near Highbridge. Beyond this confluence it is known as the River Roe, here it changes back to a north-westerly direction and is then joined by Bassen Brook before continuing through Stockdalewath, to join the River Caldew near Gaitsgill.

Hydrology
The flow of the beck has been measured at a gauging station in its lower reaches at Stockdalewath since 1999. The catchment area to the gauge is  some 91% of the total area of the beck.

See also
List of rivers of England
Arkle Beck – also has a minor tributary known as the Roe Beck

References

External links
Roe Beck water levels at Stockdalewath

Roe
2Roe